Allana May Lim (born September 12, 1988) is a Filipino professional basketball player for the Parañaque Lady Aces of the WNBL–Philippines.

College career
She became a key player for the FEU Lady Tamaraws of the University Athletic Association of the Philippines (UAAP) helping her team reach the final in Season 73 and clinch the title in  Season 74. She was also named as the Season 74 MVP.

Professional career
After her graduation from FEU, she was signed in to play for KL Ruby of the Malaysian Women's Basketball League (MWBL). She debuted in KL Ruby's 66-55 win over Bina Puri, also the first win in that season coming in for injured Australian import Jessica Fergus. Lim scored 25 points and made 10 rebounds in that game. She went on to play in the MWBL for several years and had brief stints in leagues in Singapore, Thailand, and Indonesia. In 2018, Lim played for the NS Matrix of the MWBL.

Lim played for Iso Kite of the Nepal Women's Basketball League in its inaugural season in 2019. Iso Kite failed to progress to the final. Although Iso Kite failed to clinch a berth in the final, Lim was recognized as the top scorer for the season.

Lim in plays for the Parañaque Lady Aces Women's National Basketball League in the Philippines. In the draft for the 2021 season she was selected as one of the team's "protected players" which prevented her from being drafted to another team.

National team career
She has represented the Philippines in international basketball competitions such as the 2015 Southeast Asian Games, the 2016 SEABA Championship, and the 2017 FIBA Asia Women's Championship.

References

1988 births
Living people
Competitors at the 2015 Southeast Asian Games
Filipino women's basketball players
Forwards (basketball)
Philippines women's national basketball team players
FEU Lady Tamaraws basketball players
Filipino expatriate basketball people in Malaysia
Southeast Asian Games competitors for the Philippines